The 1947 VMI Keydets football team was an American football team that represented the Virginia Military Institute (VMI) as a member of the Southern Conference during the 1947 college football season. In its first season under head coach Arthur Morton, the team compiled a 3–5–1 record (2–3–1 against conference opponents), finished in 11th place in the conference, and was outscored by a total of 152 to 120. The team played its home games at Alumni Field in Lexington, Virginia.

Schedule

References

VMI
VMI Keydets football seasons
VMI Keydets football